Maryna Mykolayivna Antsybor (born 10 October 1987, in Konotop, Ukrainian SSR) is a Ukrainian cross country skier who has competed internationally since 2005. She represented Ukraine at the 2010, 2014, and 2018 Winter Olympics. She won a gold and a bronze medal at the 2013 Winter Universiade as well as a silver medal at the 2011 Winter Universiade. . She competed at the 2022 Winter Olympics, in Women's 10 kilometre classical, Women's 30 kilometre freestyle, Women's 15 kilometre skiathlon, Women's sprint, and Women's 4 × 5 kilometre relay.

Career
Antsybor started her international career in 2005 when she participated at the 2005 European Youth Olympic Winter Festival in Swiss Monthey and finished 4th in 7.5 km freestyle race and 13th in 5 km classical race. She also took part in three FIS Nordic Junior World Ski Championships between 2005 and 2007, with her best personal result being 7th in 10 km pursuit in Italian Tarvisio in 2007.

She debuted at World Cup on December 1, 2007, in Finnish Kuusamo where she finished 61st in classical sprint. That season, she had three Top-30 results and earned her first World Cup points. As of January 2022, Antsybor's best World Cup individual finish was 19th at a 7.6 km event in Liberec, Czech Republic, on December 16, 2008, and best World Cup team finishes were 11th in team relay in Lahti, Finland, on January 24, 2021 (together with Kaminska, Olekh, and Kovalova), and in Gällivare, Sweden, on November 21, 2010 (together with Nesterenko, Hryhorenko, and Shevchenko).

At the 2010 Winter Olympics in Vancouver, she finished 14th in the 4 × 5 km relay (together with Zavalii, Hryhorenko, and Shevchenko), 15th in the team sprint (together with Hryhorenko), and 37th in the 10 km events. Antsybor also competed in the 7.5 km + 7.5 km double pursuit event, but did not finish.

She competed at the 2014 Winter Olympics in Sochi where she was 47th in skiathlon, 35th in mass start, 12th in relay (together with Antypenko, Hryhorenko, and Shevchenko) and 34th in sprint.

Antsybor was nominated for Ukrainian national team at the 2018 Winter Olympics in Pyeongchang. She was 46th in 10 km individual race, 53rd in skiathlon, 56th in sprint, and 19th in team sprint (together with Antypenko).

In 2022, Maryna Antsybor was nominated for her fourth Winter Games in Beijing.

She participated in six FIS Nordic World Ski Championships. Her best finish was 10th in the 4 × 5 km relay in 2013 (together with Antypenko, Hryhorenko, and Shevchenko) while her best individual finish was 30st in the 30 km event in 2009. She also took part in four Universiades (2007, 2011, 2013, 2015) and won three medals.

Cross-country skiing results
All results are sourced from the International Ski Federation (FIS).

Olympic Games

World Championships

World Cup

Season standings

Personal life
On February 16, 2017, she gave birth to a son.

References

External links
 
 
 

1987 births
Living people
People from Konotop
Cross-country skiers at the 2010 Winter Olympics
Cross-country skiers at the 2014 Winter Olympics
Cross-country skiers at the 2018 Winter Olympics
Cross-country skiers at the 2022 Winter Olympics
Olympic cross-country skiers of Ukraine
Ukrainian female cross-country skiers
Tour de Ski skiers
Universiade medalists in cross-country skiing
Universiade gold medalists for Ukraine
Universiade silver medalists for Ukraine
Universiade bronze medalists for Ukraine
Cross-country skiers at the 2007 Winter Universiade
Competitors at the 2011 Winter Universiade
Competitors at the 2013 Winter Universiade
Competitors at the 2015 Winter Universiade
Sportspeople from Sumy Oblast
21st-century Ukrainian women